Ursuline Academy is an independent college preparatory school for young women in grades 7–12. Located in the Roman Catholic Archdiocese of Boston, United States, it is owned and operated by the Ursuline Sisters, a worldwide teaching order. The academy is a private Catholic school located on a 28-acre campus in Dedham, Massachusetts. It provides education in all areas and offers over 20 clubs and 15 varsity sports. The Boston Globe has praised Ursuline’s athletes, the Bears, as winning the Singelais Award for maintaining a 3.0 GPA or higher and excelling in their chosen activity.

History
The first Ursuline Academy in the Boston area opened in Charlestown in 1819.  In 1957, the growing school relocated to its present site.

Athletics 
Ursuline Academy competes at the Division III or IV level (dependent on the sport) within the Massachusetts Interscholastic Athletic Association. Teams are offered at the Junior High (grades 7 and 8), JV, and Varsity levels.

In the fall, cross country, field hockey, soccer, swimming and diving, and volleyball are offered.  Winter sports include basketball, downhill skiing, ice hockey, and indoor track.  The spring sports are golf, lacrosse, sailing, softball, tennis, and track and field.

Notable alumna
Marian Walsh, Massachusetts State Senator

References

External links
Ursuline Academy
Massachusetts Department of Education directory profile

Girls' schools in Massachusetts
Catholic secondary schools in Massachusetts
Educational institutions established in 1946
Buildings and structures in Dedham, Massachusetts
Schools in Dedham, Massachusetts
Private middle schools in Massachusetts
Ursuline schools
1946 establishments in Massachusetts